The El Dorado Oilers Cotton States League baseball team based in El Dorado, Arkansas that played in 1941 and from 1947 to 1955. They also played as the El Dorado Lions from 1929 to 1940. They were affiliated with the New York Giants in 1951.

In 1954, under manager Bill Adair, they won their only league championship.

References

External links
Baseball Reference

Baseball teams established in 1929
Baseball teams disestablished in 1955
Defunct Cotton States League teams
Defunct East Dixie League teams
Defunct Dixie League teams
New York Giants minor league affiliates
Cincinnati Reds minor league affiliates
Professional baseball teams in Arkansas
1929 establishments in Arkansas
1955 disestablishments in Arkansas
El Dorado, Arkansas
Defunct baseball teams in Arkansas